Davaadelger Oktyabri (born 5 June 2000) is a Mongolian footballer who plays as a defender for Mongolian Premier League club Deren FC and the Mongolian national team.

International career
Oktyabri represented Mongolia at the youth level in 2016 AFC U-16 Championship qualification, 2018 AFC U-19 Championship qualification, and 2022 AFC U-23 Asian Cup qualification. He made his senior international debut on 7 June 2021 in a 1–0 victory over Kyrgyzstan in 2022 FIFA World Cup qualification.

International statistics

References

External links

Deren FC profile

2000 births
Living people
Mongolian footballers
Association football defenders
Mongolia international footballers
Deren FC players
Mongolian National Premier League players